The members of the National Executive Committee of the African National Congress elected at the 54th national conference in 2017 at Nasrec, which served until the 55th national conference in 2022, also held at Nasrec.

Officials

The ANC elective conference began on 16 December 2017. On the second day of the conference, delegates nominated candidates for the officials ("Top Six" leadership positions (President, Deputy President, Chairperson, Secretary General, Deputy Secretary General and Treasurer)) as follows, with voting running through the night on 17 to 18 December, and results announced on the evening of Monday 18 December (victorious candidates in bold):

Members
The remaining 80 members of the National Executive Committee were elected and announced toward the end of the conference.

 Zweli Mkhize
 Lindiwe Zulu
 Reginah Mhaule
 David Masondo
 Malusi Gigaba
 Ronald Lamola
 Violet Siwela
 Zizi Kodwa
 Nkosazana Dlamini-Zuma
 Obed Bapela
 Tito Mboweni
 Lindiwe Sisulu
 Bheki Cele
 Fikile Mbalula
 Thoko Didiza
 Sdumo Dlamini
 Bathabile Dlamini
 Senzo Mchunu
 Pravin Gordhan
 Naledi Pandor
 Alvin Botes
 Zingiswa Losi
 Jackson Mthembu
 Phumulo Masualle
 Pule Mabe
 Sfiso Buthelezi
 Mduduzi Manana
 Aaron Motsoaledi
 Thandi Modise
 Bongani Bongo
 Enoch Godongwana
 Nomvula Mokonyane
 Baleka Mbete
 Derek Hanekom
 Mondli Gungubele
 Jeff Radebe
 Edna Molewa
 Collen Maine
 Nathi Mthethwa
 Tina Joemat-Pettersson
 Nkenke Kekana
 Maite Nkoana-Mashabane
 Angie Motshekga
 David Mahlobo
 Ruth Bhengu
 Mosebenzi Zwane
 Pinky Kekana
 Nocawe Mafu
 Joe Maswanganyi
 Tony Yengeni
 Joel Netshitenzhe
 Dakota Legoete
 Nosiviwe Mapisa-Nqakula
 Noxolo Kiviet
 Ngoako Ramathlodi
 Mathole Motshekga
 Sibongile Besani
 Dikeledi Magadzi
 Thabang Makwetla
 Siyabonga Cwele
 Barbara Creecy
 Mildred Oliphant
 Mmamoloko Kubayi
 Tandi Mahambehlala
 Rosemary Capa
 Susan Shabangu
 Pinky Moloi
 Beauty Dlulane
 Pamela Tshwete
 Tokozile Xasa
 Dipuo Letsatsi-Duba
 Nomaindia Mfeketo
 Hlengiwe Mkhize
 Pemmy Majodina
 Faith Muthambi
 Rejoice Mabudafhasi
 Candith Mashego-Dlamini
 Sindisiwe Chikunga
 Gwen Ramokgopa
 Sylvia Lucas
 Blade Nzimande
 Ayanda Dlodlo
 Firoz Cachalia
 Neva Makgetla

Ex-officio members
Hlomane Chauke
Suzan Dantjies
Lerumo Kalaka
Jacob Khawe
Natso Khumalo
Soviet Lekganyane
Oscar Mabuyane
David Makhura
Stanley Mathabatha
Mookgo Matuba
Ronalda Nalumango
Mandla Ndlovu
Lulama Ngcukayitobi
Deshi Ngxanya
Paseka Nompondo
Lindiwe Ntshalintshali
Mdumiseni Ntuli
Zamani Saul
Sihle Zikalala
Snuki Zikalala
Nonceba Mhauli (ANCYL NYTT)
Joy Maimela (ANCYL NYTT)
Nompondo Paseka (Free State)
Mxolisi Dukwana (Free State)

References

List
ANC